Bostin Christopher is an American actor known for his roles in Unbreakable, Law & Order, and the 2008 film Otis.

Career 
Christopher was cast in the title role of Billy in the 2009 short film Billy's in Love, written and directed by John Larkin. He has also been featured in television shows such as Law & Order and Wonderland. Christopher also had a small role in M. Night Shyamalan's Unbreakable, as a Comic Book Clerk. He reprised his role in the 2019 sequel Glass. He also played Olaf, Mathayus' immensely strong sidekick, in Scorpion King 3. Christopher also works as an acting teacher at Virginia Commonwealth University.

Filmography

Film

Television

References

American male actors
Living people
Year of birth missing (living people)